Remount Road railway station is a Kolkata Suburban Railway station adjacent to Mominpore in Kolkata, West Bengal, India. It serves local areas of Remount Road, Mominpur, Khiddirpur and the Calcutta Dockyard areas. Only a few local trains halt here. The station has only a single platform. Its station code is RMTR.

Station complex
The platform is very much well sheltered. The station possesses many facilities including water and sanitation. It is well connected to the Remount Road in Khidderpore. There is a proper approach road to this station.

Station layout

Track Layout

See also

References

External links
 

Sealdah railway division
Railway stations in Kolkata
Transport in Kolkata
Kolkata Suburban Railway stations
Kolkata Circular Railway